Conchita is originally a diminutive for the Spanish feminine given name Concepción. Conxita is the Catalan equivalent. Conchita is also the diminutive of concha (seashell).

Conchita may refer to:

People 
 Conchita Anes (1929/1930–2004), Gibraltarian politician
 Conchita Cabrera de Armida (1862–1937), Mexican author and mystic
 Conchita Campbell (born 1995), Canadian actress
 Conchita Carpio Morales (born 1941), Philippine Ombudsman
 Conchita Cintrón (1922–2009), Peruvian Bullfighter
 Conchita Leeflang, Surinamese songstress
 Conxita Marsol Riart (born 1960), Andorran lawyer and politician
 Conchita Martínez (born 1972), Spanish professional tennis player
 Conchita (musician) (born 1981), Spanish singer
 Concepcion Picciotto, American protester
 Conchita Wurst (born 1988), Austrian singer
 Conxita Julià (1919–2019), Catalan nationalist and poet

Other 
 Conchita (beetle), a genus of hister beetle
 Conchita (opera), an opera by composer Riccardo Zandonai
 "Conchita" (song) by Lou Bega
 Conchita (album), debut studio album by Conchita Wurst

Spanish feminine given names